State Route 130 (SR 130) is a  state highway that travels southwest-to-northeast through portions of Montgomery and Toombs counties in the east-central part of the U.S. state of Georgia.

Route description
The route begins at an intersection with SR 135 in Petross in east-central Montgomery County. It heads northeast into the center of Vidalia to an intersection with US 280/SR 15/SR 29/SR 30. Farther into town is an intersection with SR 292/SR 297, where SR 292 begins a concurrency with SR 130. Just before leaving Vidalia, the two highways split with SR 292 heading to Lyons and SR 130 heading to the northeast. It continues to the northeast until it meets its eastern terminus at an intersection with US 1/SR 4 north of downtown Lyons (but within the northern part of the city limits).

A very brief portion of SR 130 in Vidalia is the only part included in the National Highway System (NHS), a system of roadways important to the nation's economy, defense, and mobility. The portion within the NHS is from the southernmost US 280 intersection to the northern city limits.

Major intersections

See also

References

External links

 
 Georgia Roads (Routes 121 - 140)

130
Transportation in Montgomery County, Georgia
Transportation in Toombs County, Georgia